1 is the first feature film of Hungarian director/production designer Pater Sparrow. It was inspired by One Human Minute by Polish science fiction writer Stanisław Lem, a work of pseudepigrapha.

Plot
A bookshop renowned for its rare works is mysteriously filled with copies of a book entitled 1, which doesn't appear to have a publisher or author. The strange almanac is filled with tables and statistics that describe everything that happens in the world in the course of one minute. A police investigation begins and the bookshop staff, along with a mysterious visitor from Vatican City who arrived just as the book did, are placed in solitary confinement by the Bureau for Paranormal Research (RDI - Reality Defense Institute). As the investigation progresses, the situation becomes more complex and the book increasingly well known, raising numerous controversies. Slowly, the lead investigator, Phil Pitch, begins to lose his grip on reality.

Festivals & awards

 The film debuted at the 40th Hungarian Film Week where it won 5 awards: Best Cinematography, Best Editor, Best Visual Design, Best Producer, and received the Best First Feature Film award from the Student Jury.
 Also won the Hungarian Film Critics Award in 2010 for best visual achievement.
 Best Director and Best Actor for Zoltán Mucsi at the 30th Fantasporto International Film Festival.
 Best Director at the 20th Fantastic Film Festival of the University of Málaga (Fancine Málaga)
 Best Sci-Fi feature at the 5th Cinefantasy Film Festival in San Paulo.
 Audience Award at the 16th International Festival of Young Filmmakers in Granada and at the 7th Fresh Film Fest in Praha.

Official selections:
 42nd SITGES International Film Festival of Fantastic Films / 'New Visions - Discovery' section
 Brussels International Fantastic Film Festival 'European' and '7th Orbit' competition
 The London International Festival Of Science Fiction and Fantastic Film
 Festival International du Film Policier de Liege
 Göteborg International Film Festival
 New York Lincoln Center/ Hungarian Film Festival
 SFF-rated Athens Intl Sci-Fi & Fantasy Film Festival
 Triest S+F International Film Festival.
 Bradford International Film Festival,
 Oslo International Film Festival,
 Brussels EuroCine 27 Festival
 Israel Icon Film Festival
 Ourense International Independent Film Festival
 Fantasy Montreal International Film Festival
 Montevideo Fantastic Film Festival

External links 
 
 
 Review of Pater Sparrow's Stanislaw Lem adaptation "1"
 
 Lem, Hungarian, two good friends – an interview with Pater Sparrow, the director of „1”
 

2009 films
2000s science fiction thriller films
Films based on works by Stanisław Lem
Hungarian science fiction thriller films